The Flying Tiger 7.5 is a Chinese trailerable sailboat that was designed by American naval architect Robert Perry as a one design racer. It was first built in 2009.

Production
The design has been built by Hansheng Yachtbuilding in Xiamen, China, since 2009 and remains in production.

Design
The Flying Tiger 7.5 is a scaled-down version of Perry's Flying Tiger 10M design, with more of a design emphasis on family sailing, as the 10 M requires a heavy crew to sail. The 7.5 hull uses aft chines to add stability and make planing easier. The rig was developed with input from sailmaker Bob Pattison of Neil Pryde Sails and the spars were designed by CST Spars of Sydney, Australia. Like the 10 M, this design received a lot of feedback and suggestions via internet forums.

The design is a racing keelboat, built predominantly of E-glass resin infusion process. It has a fractional sloop rig, with a deck-stepped mast, two sets of 28 degree swept spreaders that eliminate the need for a backstay and carbon fiber spars. The hull has a plumb stem with a retractable bowsprit, a slightly reverse transom, a removable transom-hung rudder controlled by a tiller and a lifting keel with bulb weight. The keel is made from fiberglass and carbon biber over a foam core. The rudder is made from carbon fiber and E-glass. The boat displaces  and carries  of ballast.

With it retracted, the boat can be operated in shallow water or ground transported on a trailer.

The boat is normally fitted with a small transom-mounted outboard motor for docking and maneuvering.

The design has an unfinished interior, but does have two settee berths for sleeping accommodation.

For sailing downwind the design may be equipped with an asymmetrical spinnaker flown from the bowsprit.

The design has a PHRF handicap of 84 to 93.

See also
List of sailing boat types

References

External links

Keelboats
2000s sailboat type designs
Sailing yachts
Trailer sailers
One-design sailing classes
Sailboat type designs by Robert Perry
Sailboat types built by Hansheng Yachtbuilding